Behzad Mirkhani (born 13 May 1969) is a Persian guitarist and composer, best known for his works based on folk music idioms. He is a member of Iran House of Music, Irish Music Rights Organization (IMRO), and the Registry of Guitar Tutors (RGT).

Career
Born in Tehran, since 1990, he began to compose a series of works including guitar concertos, string quartets, orchestral music and pieces for solo guitar and guitar with mixed ensemble which have received numerous performances.

In the music center of Iran ministry of culture, Behzad Mirkhani's debut album, The Last Leaf (1990), has been established as the first Iranian composition for the classical guitar. His other albums have been released since then through Iranian record labels, and internationally through CD Baby, USA.

References

External links
 The Registry of Guitar Tutors (RGT), 
 Behzad Mirkhani, Certified Teacher of The London College of Music at the University of West London, 
 An Image from Lorestan Province Iran, performed in LeFrak Concert Hall, Aaron Copland School of Music, 
 Persian Abstract, performed in LeFrak Concert Hall, Aaron Copland School of Music, 
 Classical Guitar Magazine, Letter from New York by Julia Crowe, October 2009, 
 All Music Guide, AMG, 
 AirPlay Direct, 
 Album Review (in Korean), 

1969 births
Living people
Iranian composers
Composers for the classical guitar